Wandsworth railway station can refer to any of the following:
Wandsworth Town railway station, serves Wandsworth Town Centre and Southside shopping centre
Wandsworth Common railway station, serves Wandsworth Common
Wandsworth Road railway station, in Clapham
New Wandsworth railway station, closed station in Clapham